Atrichia with papular lesions (a.k.a. "Papular atrichia") is a diffuse hair loss caused by an abnormality of the human homologue of the mouse hairless gene.

It is associated with HR.

See also
Cicatricial alopecia
 List of cutaneous conditions

References

External links 

Genodermatoses
Conditions of the skin appendages